The Lam Tara Towers was a planned complex of two towers in Dubai, United Arab Emirates. They were supposed to be built along Sheikh Zayed Road, opposite the Millennium Tower. Bin Manama tower 1 was designed to have 88 floors and a total structural height of 454 m (1,490 ft). However, in December, 2010 the construction of the twin towers was cancelled.

See also 
 List of tallest buildings in Dubai

References

External links
Lam Tara Towers on Emporis

Proposed skyscrapers in Dubai